The Siberian elm cultivar Ulmus pumila 'Dwarf Weeper' was discovered in a western Illinois garden and sold by the Arborvillage Nursery (ceased trading in 2006) Holt, Missouri.

Description
The tree was described as "a strongly weeping little plant growing  perhaps after many years". A specimen at the Arborvillage Nursery was less than  after 3 years.

Pests and diseases
The species and its cultivars are highly resistant, but not immune, to Dutch elm disease, and unaffected by the Elm Leaf Beetle Xanthogaleruca luteola.

Cultivation
Restricted to North America; the only known introduction to Europe, is at the Grange Farm Arboretum, England.

Putative specimen
A notably pendulous small-leaved elm in the JC Raulston Arboretum, Raleigh, North Carolina (2019), labelled Ulmus minor subsp. minor 'Pendula', 'Weeping small-leaved elm', has U. pumila-type fruit and is indistinguishable in leaf and form from U. pumila 'Dwarf Weeper'. The arboretum acquired other specimen trees from Arborvillage Nursery, Holt, Missouri.

Accessions
Europe
Grange Farm Arboretum, Sutton St James, Spalding, Lincolnshire, UK. Acc. No. 521

References

Siberian elm cultivar
Ulmus articles with images